Bigton is a small settlement on South Mainland, Shetland, UK. Bigton is within the civil parish of Dunrossness.

Bigton lies on the Atlantic coast of the island overlooking St Ninian's Isle and within view is the island of Burra, further to the north. It is 18 miles by road from Lerwick, just off the B9122 and lies just north of the settlement of Scousburgh. The smaller settlement of Ireland adjoins Bigton.

Facilities include a post office/shop and a cafe.

References

External links

Its entry in Shetlopedia
Canmore - Bigton, Bigton House site record
Canmore - Bigton, St Ninian's Church and Gatepiers site record

Villages in Mainland, Shetland